Trimethylguanosine synthase is an enzyme that in humans is encoded by the TGS1 gene.

Interactions 

TGS1 has been shown to interact with:
 CREB-binding protein, and 
 EED,
 EP300, 
 MED1,  and
 NCOA6.

References

Further reading